The President of Imperial College London is the highest academic official of Imperial College London. The President, formerly known as the Rector, is the chief executive, elected by the Council of the college and Chairman of the Senate. The position is currently held by Hugh Brady, who succeeded Alice Gast in August 2022.

In 2012 the responsibilities were separated into two posts, the President & Rector whose duty is to "promote Imperial's position as a global university" and Provost who will "be responsible for advancing and delivering the College's core academic mission - education, research and translation." Alice Gast now serves as President & Rector, while James Stirling became the first Provost of Imperial College London in August 2013.

The Rector's residence is a large house on Queen's Gate, at the southwest corner of the college's campus in South Kensington, London.

List of rectors

 1908 Henry Bovey
 1910 Alfred Keogh
 1922 Thomas Henry Holland
 1929 Henry Tizard
 1942 Richard Southwell
 1948 Roderic Hill
 1954 Patrick Linstead
 1966 Owen Saunders (Acting Rector)
 1967 William Penney
 1973 Brian Flowers
 1985 Eric Ash
 1993 Ronald Oxburgh
 2000 Richard Sykes
 2008 Roy Anderson
 2009 Keith O'Nions (Acting Rector)
 2010 Keith O'Nions (Full appointment)
 2014 Alice Gast
 2022 Hugh Brady

List of presidents
Until some time into Alice Gast's tenure the role was known as both President and Rector.

 2012 Keith O'Nions
 2014 Alice Gast

See also
 List of Imperial College London people

References

External links
Imperial College London website

People associated with Imperial College London

Imperial College London, Presidents
Imperial College London